Charlie Daniel Brown (born 23 September 1999) is an English professional footballer who plays as a forward for League One club Cheltenham Town.

Club career

Chelsea
Brown spent his early years with the academy of Ipswich Town before joining Chelsea in 2016. He was a prolific goalscorer for the club's academy teams and development squad, scoring 53 goals in 108 appearances for Chelsea's U18, U19 and U23 sides.

Following the culmination of the 2018–19 UEFA Youth League, Brown was awarded the Golden Boot for Chelsea U23s having scored 12 goals in 9 appearances during the competition. As of January 2021 he is the all-time joint record scorer for the competition with 15 goals, along with Borja Mayoral and Roberto.

On 31 January 2020, Brown joined Belgian First Division B side Union SG on loan until the end of the season. On 8 February 2020, he made his professional league debut, as a substitute in a 0-0 draw with Virton. After three appearances, the loan deal was extended for another season in July 2020. However, after failing to make an appearance in the opening months of the season, his loan deal was terminated in October 2020 and he returned to Chelsea.

Milton Keynes Dons
On 13 January 2021, Brown joined League One club Milton Keynes Dons on a permanent deal. He made his debut for the club on 16 January 2021 as a 76th-minute substitute in a 3–0 defeat away to Peterborough United. On 20 February 2021, Brown scored the winning goal - his first at senior level as a professional - in a 4–3 home win over Northampton Town.

Cheltenham Town
On 6 January 2022, Brown joined League One club Cheltenham Town, signing for an undisclosed fee.

Personal life
He is the older brother of Felixstowe and Walton’s Zak Brown.

Career statistics
.

Honours
Chelsea U18
FA Youth Cup: 2017–18
U18 Premier League: 2017–18
U18 Premier League Cup: 2017–18
U18 Premier League South: 2017–18

Individual
UEFA Youth League Golden Boot: 2018–19

References

External links

1999 births
Living people
Sportspeople from Ipswich
English footballers
English expatriate footballers
Ipswich Town F.C. players
Chelsea F.C. players
Milton Keynes Dons F.C. players
Cheltenham Town F.C. players
Royale Union Saint-Gilloise players
Challenger Pro League players
Association football forwards
English expatriate sportspeople in Belgium
Expatriate footballers in Belgium